University College, Thiruvananthapuram (UCT) is a constituent college of the University of Kerala, based primarily in Thiruvananthapuram, the capital of the Indian state of Kerala.

Location
The college is located at the heart of Thiruvananthapuram in a locality called Palayam.

Academics

Faculties

Language faculties
 Faculty of English
 Faculty of Malayalam
 Faculty of Hindi
 Faculty of Arabic
 Faculty of Sanskrit
 Faculty of Tamil
 Faculty of French

Humanities faculties
 Faculty of Economics
 Faculty of History
 Faculty of Political Science
 Faculty of Islamic History
 Faculty of Philosophy

Science faculties
 Faculty of Chemistry
 Faculty of Biochemistry
 Faculty of Mathematics
 Faculty of Physics
 Faculty of Geology
 Faculty of Geography
 Faculty of Botany
 Faculty of Zoology
 Faculty of Statistics
 Faculty of Psychology

Other faculties
 Faculty of Physical Education

Admissions
University College is an affiliated college of University of Kerala. Hence admissions to BA/BSc, MA/MSc, M.Phil programs are done by the Online Centralized Allotment Process of the university.

Rankings

The college was ranked 24 among colleges in India by National Institutional Ranking Framework (NIRF) in 2022

Notable alumni
University College Thiruvananthapuram has produced luminaries that include a former president of India, two former chief ministers of Kerala, cabinet secretaries, ambassadors, civil servants, IT doyens, teachers, poets, writers, artists and politicians.

 Abu Abraham, cartoonist
 Anna Chandy, first woman judge in India; first woman in India to become a high court judge
 A. R. Raja Raja Varma, poet, grammatician, professor
 Ayyappa Paniker, poet and critic
 Balabhaskar, Malayalam music director and Violinist
 Balachandra Menon, national award-winning Indian film actor, director, and script writer & lawyer
 Bharath Gopi, Indian film actor, director, and producer
 Bheeman Raghu, actor
 C. K. Chandrappan Parliamentarian and former Kerala state secretary of CPI party
 C. V. Raman Pillai, playwright and novelist
 E. D. Jemmis, Bhatnagar award winner and former director of IISER-TVM
 Fathima Beevi first woman judge of Supreme Court of India
 George Joseph
 G. Madhavan Nair, former chairman of ISRO
 G. R. Anil, Minister for Civil Supplies & Legal Metrology, Government of Kerala 
 G. Venugopal, Malayalam playback singer, composer
 Jacob Punnoose, former Director General of Police, Kerala
 J C Daniel, "father of Malayalam cinema"
 J. Alexander (politician), Former Chief Secretary and Cabinet Minister, Karnataka State
 Karamana Janardanan Nair, Malayalam actor
 Kesari Balakrishna Pillai
 K.M. Chandy - former Governor (MP, Gujarat & pondicherry)
 Kodiyeri Balakrishnan, Former secretary of CPI(M) Kerala state, Former Minister of Home affairs State of Kerala 
 K. R. Narayanan, former president of India.
 Kris Gopalakrishnan, CEO of Infosys
 K. Shankar Pillai, cartoonist and Padma Bhushan recipient
 Madhu, film actor
 Mahesh Narayan, Malayalam film director and editor
 Malayattoor Ramakrishnan, IAS officer, author, cartoonist
 Mary Poonen Lukose, obstetrician, gynaecologist, first female surgeon general of India
 M. Krishnan Nair, writer, literary critic, and orator
 M. K. Sanu, professor, orator, critic, biographer
 M. M. Jacob, Former Governor of Arunachal Pradhesh
 M.S.Swaminathan, "father of Green Revolution" in India
 Nitya Chaitanya Yati, philosopher, psychologist, and poet
 O. N. V Kurup, poet, lyricist, professor and Jnanpith award winner
 Pattom A. Thanu Pillai, former chief minister of Kerala
 P. C. Alexander, civil servant, administrator
 P. Gopinathan Nair, Gandhian and Padma Shri recipient
 P. K. Iyengar, Indian nuclear physicist
 P. Padmarajan, Indian author, screenwriter, and film director
 P. Parameswaran, Padma Vibhushan awardee, president of Vivekananda Kendra
 Prasanth Reghuvamsom, Senior Journalist, Asianet News
 Priyadarshan, national award-winning Indian film director, script writer, and producer
 Raja Ravi Varma, world-famous painter
 Raman Viswanathan, chest physician and Padma Bhushan awardee
 R. Sankar, former chief minister of Kerala
 Sabumon Abdusamad, Malayalam actor and television anchor
 Sethunathasarma Krishnaswami, geochemist, Shanti Swarup Bhatnagar laureate
 Shaji N. Karun, national award-winning Indian film director and cinematographer
 S. Guptan Nair, Malayalam writer, critic, scholar, and orator
 S. Suresh Babu, atmospheric scientist, Shanti Swarup Bhatnagar laureate
 Sudheer Karamana, Malayalam film actor and artist
 Sugathakumari, poet and environmentalist
 Sukumaran, Malayalam film actor, producer
 S. Venkitaramanan, former governor of Reserve Bank of India
 Thanu Padmanabhan, Indian theoretical physicist
 T. K. Rajeev Kumar, Malayalam director
 Tony Mathew, Orator, Writer
 T. P. Sreenivasan, Indian diplomat, former IFS officer
 Venu Nagavally, Malayalam director, actor, screenwriter
 V. Madhusoodanan Nair, professor, poet
 A. A. Rahim (politician), Rajya Sabha MP

Succession list of principals
H. H. The Maharaja's College
 John Ross M.A. 1866–1884
 Robert Harvey M.A., L.L.D. 1884–1890
 H.N. Read M.A. 1890–1892 (acting)
 Dr Alexander Crichton Mitchell D.Sc., F.R.S.E 1892–1909
 A.W. Bishop PhD 1909–1915
 L.C. Hodson M.A. 1912–1915
 A. R. Raja Raja Varma Kovil Thampuran M.A 1915–1916, 1918
 Dr. J. Stephenson, BSc, A.R.D.S.C. 1916–1927

H. H. The Maharaja's Science College
 R. Krishnaswamy Iyer, V.A. 1924–1927
 James Pryde, M.A., BSc 1927–1930
 C.V. Chandrasekharan, M.A (Oxon) 1930–1931
 K.V. Rangaswamy Aiyangar, M.A. (Oxon) 1931–1935 (on leave)
 K.L. Moudgil, M.A., D.Sc., F.L.C. 1933–1934 (acting) and 1935–1937 and 1938–1941
 A. Gopala Menon, M.A., B.Com. 1934–1935 (acting)
 R. Srinivasan, M.A. 1937–1938 and 1941–1942

HH. The Maharaja's Arts College 
 K.V. Rangaswamy Aiyangar, M.A. 1924–1928 and 1930–1933
 C.V. Chandrasekharan, M.A (Oxon) 1928–1930 (ag.) and 1933–1935
 A. Gopala Menon, M.A., B.Com. 1935–1937
 P.G. Sahasranama Iyer, M.A. 1937–1942

University College
 Sr. H. Subrahmonia Iyer, M.A., PhD 1942–1948
 Sri. V. Narayana Pillai, M.A., B.L. 1948 (acting)
 Sri. V. Sundararaja Naidu, M.A., B.L.T.D, 1948–1949 (acting) and 1950
 Dr. T.K. Koshy, M.A., PhD 1949–1950
 Sri. C.V. Subbarama Iyer, M.A. 1950–1951 (acting)
 Dr. C.S. Venkateswaran, M.A., MSc, D.Sc., F.Inst.P.FA.Sc. 1951–1957
 Dr. A. Narayanan Potti, M.N., PhD January–August 1954 (acting)
 Sri. C.S. Venkateswaran 1954 August – 1956 November
 Dr. A. Narayanan Potti, M.A., PhD November 1956 – March 1957
 Dr. K. Bhaskaran Nair, MSc, D.Sc. April 1957 – February 1960
 Sri. V.R. Pillai, M.S., MSc February 1960 – March 1962
 Sri. E.P. Narayana Pillai. M.A. (Madras and Oxford) March 1962 – March 1964
 Dr. N. Subramonia Wariyar, MSc, MSc, PhD, FIC. March 1964 – March 1969
 Dr. S. Parameswara Iyer, MSc, PhD 1-4-1959 to 3-7-1969 (acting)
 Sri. R. Suryanarayanan, M.A., B.T. 1969 to March 1977
 Dr. (Mrs.) N.I. Joseph 1-4-1977 to 31-3-1978
 Sri. P. Madusudana Perumal Pillai 1 April 1978 to 6 April 1981
 Sri. K.M. Zachariah 6 April 1981 to 31 March 1982
 Sri. G. Nagappan Nair 1-4-1982 to 31-3-1984
 Sri. A.G. Ramachandran 1-4-1984 to 29-3-1985
 Prof. A. Nabeesa Ummal 1-6-1985 to 31-3-1986
 Prof. C. Ebertchellam 1986–1987
 Prof. S. Ponnayyan 5-8-1987 to 31-3-1989
 Prof. K. Somanadhan from 20-4-1989 to 31-3-1990
 Prof. Rama Sarma 5-5-1990
 Prof. M. Sarojini 14-2-1991 to 31-3-1991
 Dr. H. Parameswaran from 3-4-1991 to 30-4-1991
 Prof. V. Hamsa Devi 21-8-1991 to 24-6-1992
 Prof. R. Balakrishnan Nair 24-6-1992 to 3-11-1992
 Prof. I. Sundaram Pillai 4-11-1992 to 31-3-1993
 Prof. R. Balakrishnan Nair 24-6-1992 to 3-11-1992 and 5-4-1993 to 18-5-1993
 Prof. R. Harihara Subrahmonia Iyer 18-5-1995 to 26-12-1995
 Prof. B. Padmakumari 26-12-1995 to 17-6-1996
 Prof. P. Sahadevan 17-6-1996 to 31-5-1998
 Dr. K.Sukumaran 31-5-1998 to 17-7-1998
 Smt. P. Saraswathy Amma 17-7-1998 to 31-3-1999
 Sri. S. Mohan Kumar 31-3-1999 to 16-6-1999
 Prof. B. Rishikesan Thampy 16-6-1999
 Sri. G. Gopalakrishnan
 Sr. V.R. Ramachandran
 Prof. S. Varghese 6-8-2001 to 16-8-2002
 Smt. Vijayakumi Jaya Singh 17-8-2002 to 31-3-2003
 Prof. Prasanna 28-6-2003 to 30-6-2003
 Prof. A. Salahudeen Kunju 1/7/2003 to 31 March 2004
 Prof. Dr. D. Maya 1/4/2004 to 31 March 2005
 Prof. M.S. Girija 18 August 2005 to 28 April 2006
 Dr. Cyriac Mathews 28 April 2006 to 28 July 2007
 Dr. Asha Balagandharan 27 July 2007 to 30-6-2008
 Smt. Shobha Ravindranath 19 July 2008 to 31 March 2009
 Dr. B.S. Mohanachandran 18 July 2009 to 31 March 2010
 Dr. M. Abdul Rahim 18 June 2010 to 31 March 2011
 Dr. D. Premlal 26-08-2011 to 22-02-2012
 Prof. K. B. Ajithakumar 22-02-2012 to 31-05-2012
 Dr. S. Rajoo Krishnan 27 September 2012 to 04/10/2012
 Prof. R. Thulaseedharan Pillai 04/10/2012 to 02-03-2013
 Prof. T. P. Nalinakshan 21-03-2013 to 30-04-2013
 Dr. T. G. Sarachandran 09-05-2013 to 24-06-2013
 Dr. C. Moly Marceline	  24-06-2013 to 31-03-2014
 Dr. Thomas Kuruvila 09-04-2014 to 12-05-2014
 Dr. J. Vijayamohanan	19-05-2014 to 30-07-2014
 Dr. V. T. Beena 02-08-2014 to 31-03-2015
 Prof. K. Jayakumar	28-05-2015 to 31-05-2015
 Dr. M. K. Thankamani	26-06-2015 onwards

Controversy 
On 3 May 2019, a first-year BSc Chemistry student attempted suicide on campus, alleging harassment from SFI leaders for not taking part in their programmes and disruption of classes.

On 12 July 2019, a final year B.A. Political Science student was stabbed amid a dispute between two groups of students belonging to the SFI, following which two SFI leaders were arrested.  Later in the day, answer sheets and the official seal of an Assistant Professor were recovered while clearing the SFI office on campus, raising questions on the credibility of examinations conducted by the university. The police also found fake seals and university answer sheets from the residence of a prime accused.

See also
 Campus Violence in India

References

External links

 University College Thiruvananthapuram, Official website
 University College Thiruvananthapuram, webpage at University of Kerala

See also

 
Colleges in Thiruvananthapuram
Arts and Science colleges in Kerala
1834 establishments in India
Educational institutions established in 1834
Colleges affiliated to the University of Kerala
Academic institutions formerly affiliated with the University of Madras